Cindy Lou may refer to:

Songs
 original title of "Peggy Sue", written by Buddy Holly, Jerry Allison and Norman Petty
 "Cindy Lou", a 1955 song by the Boogie Ramblers, later renamed Cookie and his Cupcakes
 "Cindy Lou", a 1957 song by Dick Penner
 "Little Loved One/Cindy Lou!", a 1963 single by Keith O'Conner Murphy
 "Cindy Lou", a track on the 1994 album C. C. Adcock
 "Cindy Lou", a song by French singer David Christie (born Jacques Pepino)

Fictional characters
 Cindy Lou Who, in the Dr. Seuss story How the Grinch Stole Christmas! and various derived works
 Cindy Lou, in the 1943 Broadway musical Carmen Jones and the 1954 film adaptation
 Cindy Lou, a recurring character in season 3 of the Australian TV series Wentworth
 Cindy Lou, a ring name of Winona Littleheart (born 1961), retired professional wrestler

See also
 Cindy-Lu Bailey (born 1965), former Australian deaf swimmer who competed in the Commonwealth Games and Deaflympics
 Cindy Lu, a member of the winning American team in the 2014 Pacific Rim Gymnastics Championships – Rhythmic Gymnastics